Amarete is a small town in Bolivia. In 2010 it had an estimated population of 2203.

References

Populated places in La Paz Department (Bolivia)